

Animals in Japan

Mammals

Birds

Japanese quail
Green pheasant
Japanese wagtail
Japanese bantam
Okinawa woodpecker
Red-crowned crane
Blakiston's fish owl

Marine animals
Japanese sea lily
Japanese spider crab
Giant squid
Nomura's jellyfish
Firefly squid
Tachypleus tridentatus

Fish

Reptiles

Habu, four different species of venomous snake that exist in certain islands including Okinawa, the Sakishima Islands and the Tokara Islands, but not on the islands of Honshu, Kyushu, Shikoku, Hokkaido.
Mamushi, a species of venomous snake that exists in all areas of Japan except certain islands including Okinawa and Amami Ōshima.
Gekko hokouensis
Japanese pond turtle
Schlegel's Japanese gecko
Japanese keelback
Achalinus spinalis
Japanese striped snake
Rhabdophis tigrinus
Japanese rat snake
Iwasaki's snail-eater

Amphibians

Japanese giant salamander
Montane brown frog
Japanese fire belly newt
Japanese tree frog
Japanese brown frog
Daruma pond frog
Japanese common toad
Japanese stream toad

Insects

Luciola cruciata
Sasakia charonda
Papilio maackii
Tanna japonensis
Nephila clavata
Asian giant hornet
Hyalessa maculaticollis
Carabus insulicola
Aquatica lateralis
Carabus blaptoides
Chrysochroa fulgidissima
Brown marmorated stink bug

Molluscs

Japonia striatula
Haliotis exigua
Trochochlamys ogasawarana
Haliotis madaka
Haliotis discus

See also
Wildlife of Japan
List of mammals of Japan

References

Fauna of Japan
Japan